Henry Alberto Rodríguez (born February 25, 1987) is a former professional baseball pitcher. He played in Major League Baseball (MLB) for the Oakland Athletics, Washington Nationals, Chicago Cubs and Miami Marlins.

Professional career

Oakland Athletics
Rodríguez began his professional career in 2006, with the Arizona League Athletics. With them, he went 5–2 with a 7.42 ERA in 15 games (four starts), striking out 59 batters in 43 innings of work.

In 2007, he went 6–8 with a 3.07 ERA in 20 games (18 starts), striking out 106 batters in 99 innings for the Kane County Cougars. He split the 2008 season between the Stockton Ports and the Midland RockHounds, finishing with a 4–10 record and a 5.20 ERA in 34 games (22 starts), while striking out 147 batters in 116 innings of work.

He made his major league debut in the 8th inning of the September 21 game against the Texas Rangers, where he gave up 2 runs (1 earned) on 1 hit and 1 walk while striking out 1.

Washington Nationals
On December 16, 2010, Rodríguez, along with outfielder Corey Brown, was traded to the Nationals in exchange for Josh Willingham. Rodríguez appeared in 59 games in the 2011 season and earned a 3–3 record with a 3.56 ERA and 70 strikeouts.

Rodríguez was given an opportunity to close games for the Nationals in 2012 with regular stopper Drew Storen on the disabled list, but bouts of wildness led manager Davey Johnson to move Rodríguez out of the role by the end of May. He continued as a reliever, and pitched in 35 games in 2012, finishing with a 1-3 record, a 5.83 ERA, and 9 saves.

After pitching in 17 games with a 4.00 ERA in 2013, Rodriguez was designated for assignment on June 4, 2013.

Chicago Cubs
On June 11, 2013, Rodriguez was traded to the Chicago Cubs for right handed pitcher Ian Dickson. He was designated for assignment on July 14, clearing a spot on the active roster for Cole Gillespie. In 5 games, he walked 4 over 4 innings, striking out 1 with a 4.50 ERA.

Miami Marlins
Rodríguez signed a minor league deal with the Miami Marlins on January 16, 2014. He was designated for assignment on May 14, 2014. On June 12, the Marlins released Rodriguez.

Chicago White Sox
Rodríguez signed a minor league deal with the Chicago White Sox on June 13, 2014. He was released a month later after walking 8 batters in less than 2 innings for the Triple A Charlotte Knights.

Arizona Diamondbacks
Rodriguez signed a minor league deal with the Arizona Diamondbacks on January 22, 2015. He was released on March 31.

Pitching style
Rodríguez is known for a hard four-seam fastball averaging 98 mph over the course of his career. It tends to sit between 96 and 100 mph, reaching as high as 103 mph. A 103.2 mph fastball which he threw on September 15, 2010 was the third-fastest pitch ever recorded by PITCHf/x at the time. His secondary pitch is a curveball (83-85 mph), and a seldom thrown changeup.

Rodríguez's prowess has been hampered by a high walk rate of 5.6 per 9 innings. He also led the National League in wild pitches in 2011, and is leading the league again in 2012 despite having thrown only 21 innings. In the  he has pitched since the beginning of the 2011 season, Rodríguez has thrown 23 wild pitches.

See also
 List of Major League Baseball players from Venezuela

References

External links

1987 births
Living people
Águilas del Zulia players
Arizona League Athletics players
Arizona League White Sox players
Charlotte Knights players
Chicago Cubs players
Harrisburg Senators players
Iowa Cubs players
Kane County Cougars players
Leones del Caracas players
Major League Baseball pitchers
Major League Baseball players from Venezuela
Miami Marlins players
Midland RockHounds players
New Orleans Zephyrs players
Oakland Athletics players
People from Zulia
Sacramento River Cats players
Stockton Ports players
Syracuse Chiefs players
Tiburones de La Guaira players
Venezuelan expatriate baseball players in the United States
Washington Nationals players